Athanase Charles Marie Charette de La Contrie (3 September 1832, in Nantes – 9 October 1911, in La Basse-Motte (Saint-Père, Ille-et-Vilaine)) was a French royalist military commander, general, great-grandson of King Charles X, grandson of Charles Ferdinand, Duke of Berry, descendant of Louis XIV and Louis XIII all of House of Bourbon. He is also a descendant of Marie de' Medici.

Early life
Athanase Charles Marie Charette de La Contrie was born on September 3, 1832, in Nantes, France. His great-grandfather was Charles X the penultimate king of France, and his great-uncle, General de Charette, was shot in Nantes on 29 March 1795, during the War in the Vendée. His mother, Louise, Countess de Vierzon, was the daughter of the Duke of Berry and Amy Brown Freeman. As the Duchesse de Berry was at that time in hiding at Nantes, and Charette's father was being sought by the police, the child's birth was concealed; he was secretly taken from Nantes on 17 September and was registered in the commune of Sainte-Reine as born on 18 September.

Unwilling, by reason of his legitimist antecedents, to serve in France under Louis Philippe, young Charette, in 1846, entered the Military Academy of Turin; he left in 1848 to avoid serving Piedmont-Sardinia, the revolutionary policy of that kingdom being evident to him.

Military career
In 1852 the Duke of Modena, the brother-in-law of Henri, Count of Chambord, appointed Charette sub-lieutenant in an Austrian regiment stationed in the duchy. Duke Francis V was not only ruler of Modena but was also an Austrian archduke and the Jacobite successor to the thrones of England, Scotland and Ireland. Duke Francis was a most exemplary ruler who, with his own hands, tended to and served the victims of cholera that broke out in his duchy when the Piedmontese revolutionary army invaded. The Piedmontese annexed and incorporated Modena into the new, anti-Catholic Italy.

Charette was thereby, compelled to relinquish regimental service as, once again, he did not wish to serve in a revolutionary army.

In May 1860, when two of his brothers, like him eager to fight the Italian revolutionaries, offered their services to the King of Naples, he went to Rome and placed himself at the service of Pope Pius IX, who had commissioned Lamoricière to organize an army for the defence of the Papal States. Charette was appointed captain of the first company of the Franco-Belgian Volunteers, known after 1861 as the Papal Zouaves, and was wounded at the Battle of Castelfidardo (September 1860).

After the capture of Rome by the Kingdom of Italy, Charette negotiated with Gambetta for the employment of the French Zouaves in the service of France in the Franco-Prussian War; he was permitted to organize them as "Volunteers of the West". Wounded at Loigny, Charette was made prisoner; but he escaped, and on 14 January 1871, the Provisional Government of France made him a general. He was elected to the National Assembly by the department of Bouches-du-Rhône, but resigned without taking his seat. Thiers proposed his entering the French army with his Zouaves, but Charette declared his intention of remaining at the pope's disposal. On 15 August 1871, his Zouaves were mustered out of the French army. Retiring into private life, Charette passed his last thirty years serving the cause of religion and hoping for the restoration of the monarchy.

Personal life
In Italy, Charette met his future (second) wife Antoinette Van Leer Polk in the Gilded Age. She was an American Southern belle, who was the great-niece of the 11th President of the United States James K. Polk and the "Mad" General Anthony Wayne of the American Revolutionary War. She is also a direct descendant of Samuel Van Leer, a patriarch of a wealthy family in Pennsylvania noted in the anti-slavery cause.

Charette was father of two children with his first wife and of two other children with the second. His direct descendant Susan Charette de la Contrie would marry General Ronald R. Van Stockum.

Death
He died on October 9, 1911.

References

1832 births
1911 deaths
Military personnel from Nantes
Nobility from Nantes
People from Versailles
French generals
Military personnel from Paris